The 1973–74 1. Slovenská národná hokejová liga season was the 5th season of the 1. Slovenská národná hokejová liga, the second level of ice hockey in Czechoslovakia alongside the 1. Česká národní hokejová liga. 12 teams participated in the league, and ŠK Liptovský Mikuláš won the championship. TJ AC Nitra relegated and TJ Slovan CHZJD Bratislava B ceased its activities and disappeared.

Regular season

Standings

The team TJ Slovan CHZJD Bratislava B ceased its activities and disappeared.

Qualification to 1974–75 Czechoslovak Extraliga

 TJ Gottwaldov – ŠK Liptovský Mikuláš 3–1 (9–2, 8–2, 4–5PP, 8–2)
 TJ Gottwaldov won the series 3–1 and qualified to 1974–75 Czechoslovak Extraliga.

References

External links
 Season on avlh.sweb.cz (PDF)
 Season on hokejpoprad.sk

Czech
1st. Slovak National Hockey League seasons
2